The Lal Masjid is a mosque located in Islamabad, the capital of Pakistan. It is located near Abpara Market. It was constructed in 1966 and is one of the oldest mosques in the city. It was also the largest mosque in the city for twenty years, until the Faisal Mosque was built in 1986.

The mosque later came to be known as the site of a siege which led to a military operation by the Pakistan Army against the leaders and students of the mosque, resulting in hundreds of deaths.

History 
The Red Mosque located on Masjid (mosque) Road is one of the oldest mosques within the capital. Before the construction of Faisal Mosque, the Red Mosque was the largest in the capital. Located in a very central position, it lies in close proximity to the two busy commercial centres - the Aabpara Market in the east and the Melody Market in the north. It was built  according to Capital Development Authority (CDA) records. Maulana Muhammad Abdullah Ghazi was appointed its first imam. 

Abdullah was critical of all governments except Muhammad Zia-ul-Haq's. Zia-ul-Haq had a close relationship with Maulana Muhammad Abdullah, the former head of the mosque. During the Soviet–Afghan War (1979–1989), the Red Mosque played a role in recruiting and training mujahideen to fight with or alongside Afghan mujahideen. Throughout its existence several thousand male and female students have lived in adjacent seminaries.

After Maulana Muhammad Abdullah was assassinated in 1998, his sons Abdul Aziz and Abdul Rashid took over the mosque. As of 2022, Abdul Aziz remains the official khateeb (sermon giver) of the mosque.

Siege

On 3 July 2007, the stand-off between the students barricaded inside the mosque and the government resulted in bloody gun battles in which over twenty people, including students of the mosque, members of the media, paramilitary personnel, and a businessman were reportedly killed, and over one hundred others were injured. An FIR was later registered against Aziz and Rashid with charges ranging from kidnapping and murder to treason, as well as terrorism. People who supported the activities of Lal Masjid said they were only attacking "Chinese girls who were prostitutes and they [were] destroying CD shops which sold pornography." Lal Masjid held on to what many people call "pure and true Muslim ethic" and what the opposing parties called "fundamental and dogmatic".

Aziz and Rashid were negotiating the conflict with then Senior Minister for Religious Affairs, Ijaz-ul-Haq in consultation with Chaudhry Shujaat Hussain, President of Pakistan Muslim League (Q). According to last minute reports, the negotiations were deemed successful. Reportedly, after the minister left the Mosque, he changed his stance and could not defend the commitments he made at the mosque.

Government and security officials had repeatedly asked Maulana Abdul Rashid to surrender but he refused. He proposed that if government would give him and his students safe passage to allow him to live a silent life in his home village, he would hand over Lal Masjid to government, Jamia Hafsa and Faridia University to Wafaqul Madaris (a federation of Madaris). This agreement was made between Ulmai Karam and Government including Prime Minister Shaukat Aziz and Chaudhry Shujaat Hussain but at the final moment President Pervez Musharraf canceled the agreement and ordered to attack the mosque where hundreds of female students were present

Mosque stormed 

On 8 July 2007, most of the private media outlets (such as Geo and Aaj, among others) became convinced from the movements of the security forces on the ground that they were preparing to storm the building. At dawn on Tuesday, 10 July, after attempts at negotiation failed, government troops stormed the mosque, taking control of most of the complex.

Many conflicting reports swirled around the incident and it is difficult to determine the truth of these given the very sensitive political nature of the event; the actual number of casualties still cannot be verified independently. Many believe the casualties were between 300 and 400.
 
When asked about the alleged foreigners the government was unable to prove the presence of any foreigners in the mosque and many believe that some locals as were dubbed as foreigners.

Aftermath 
Following the week-long siege, the country entered a three-day mourning period. The bodies of those killed were buried in temporary graves, awaiting collection from family members. Hundreds of Abdul Rashid's supporters attended his funeral in his Punjabi village, amid calls for Holy War. This gave rise to fears of a violent backlash from fundamentalist quarters; the police and military were placed on high alert. Ayman al-Zawahiri, Al-Qaeda's second in command, released a message which included the sentence: "Your salvation is only through jihad", heightening tensions in the region.

July 2008 bombing near Lal Masjid

On 6 July 2008, at 7:50 PM local time, a bomb exploded near Lal Masjid, killing 18 policemen and 1 civilian. A Pakistani official claimed the bombing occurred on the first anniversary of the siege and was a revenge attack. The attack occurred even amidst tight security in Islamabad, where thousands of Islamic students in Pakistan came to mark the day when Pakistani troops stormed Lal Masjid. The blast was the work of a suicide bomber around 30 years of age. Advisor to the Prime Minister on Interior Rehman Malik, who visited the blast site, said about 12,000 students attended the rally and the attack was directed at the police.

Current situation 
The mosque was opened to public three weeks after the siege. Bahria Town took responsibility of renovating the mosque, and renovation was completed by 2010. Upon his release, Maulana Abdul Aziz resumed his post as the imam (cleric).

References

External links
@Lal Masjid Official
@Jamia Hafsa Official

1965 establishments in Pakistan
Deobandi mosques
History of Pakistan
Mosques in Islamabad
Mosques completed in 1965